Rokytne is an urban-type settlement in Rivne Oblast (province) in western Ukraine. It also formerly served as the administrative center of Rokytne Raion, housing the district's local administration buildings until the raion's abolition in 2020, and is now administered within Sarny Raion. Its population was 7,143 as of the 2001 Ukrainian Census. Current population: 

A settlement named Okhotnikove was located on the territory of Rokytne since around the 17th century. In 1888, the village of Okhotnikove was incorporated, and it kept that name until it was renamed to "Rokytne" in 1922. Rokytne acquired the status of an urban-type settlement in 1940. Rokytne is the birthplace of a Ukrainian-American theologian, historian, and political analyst Serhii F. Dezhnyuk.

References

Urban-type settlements in Sarny Raion
Ovruchsky Uyezd
Polesie Voivodeship
Wołyń Voivodeship (1921–1939)
Populated places established in 1888